Erupa somenella is a moth in the family Crambidae. It was described by Schaus in 1922. It is found in Guatemala.

References

Erupini
Moths described in 1922